Mount Hector can refer to:
Mount Hector (Antarctica) in Antarctica
Mount Hector (Alberta) in Alberta, Canada
Mount Hector (New Zealand) in the southern North Island